Crime in Switzerland is combated mainly by cantonal police. The Federal Office of Police investigates organised crime, money laundering and terrorism.

Crime statistics 
In Switzerland, police registered a total of 432,000 offenses under the Criminal Code in 2019 (−0.2% compared with previous year), of which were 110,140 or 25.5% cases of thefts (excluding vehicles, −2.0%), and 41,944 or 9.7% cases of thefts of vehicles (including bicycles, −10.1%), 46 killings and 161 attempted murders. The number of cases of rape reported increased by 53 or 8.5% over the previous year. The number of criminal pornography offenses increased by 56.1% to 2,837. Offenses against the Narcotics Act decreased by 0.7% to 75,757.

In 2014, 110,124 adults were convicted, of which 55,240 (50%) were convicted according to traffic regulation offences, 6,540 (+1.6%) for trafficking in narcotic substances, and 17,882 (−7.2%) for offenses against the Federal Act on Foreign Nationals. 83,014 or 83.4% of adult convicted people are male, and 42,289 or 42.5% of them Swiss citizens.
In the same year, 11,484 minors (78% of them male, 68% of them of Swiss nationality, 64.2% aged either 16 or 17) were convicted.

Convictions for infliction of bodily harm have steadily increased throughout the 1990s and 2000s, with 23 convictions for serious injury and 831 for light injury in 1990 as opposed to 78 and 2,342, respectively, in 2005. Convictions for rape have also slightly increased, fluctuating between 500 and 600 cases per year in the period 1985 to 1995, but between 600 and 700 cases in the period 2000 to 2005. Consistent with these trends, convictions for threats or violence directed against officials has consistently risen in the same period, from 348 in 1990 to 891 in 2003.

Types of convictions
The number of convicted persons is given in the following tables. Each class of crime references the relevant section of the Strafgesetzbuch (Criminal Code, abbreviated as StGB in German), or Betäubungsmittelgesetz (abbr. BetmG, Narcotics Act), or the Strassenverkehrsgesetz (abbr. SVG, Swiss Traffic Regulations).

 2016 conviction numbers may not include convictions overturned on appeal.
 Due to privacy protection laws some convictions are not included.

 2016 conviction numbers may not include convictions overturned on appeal.
 Due to privacy protection laws some convictions are not included.

Historic conviction rates
The historic adult conviction rates are given in the following chart:

 2014 conviction numbers may not include convictions overturned on appeal.

Age at conviction
The age of the individuals at the time of their convictions is given in this chart:

 2014 conviction numbers may not include convictions overturned on appeal.

Juvenile crimes

According to official statistics, there has been a total of 20,902 juvenile convictions in 2021 – 7.5% more than in 2020. According to a survey about juvenile crimes in 2021, 6.4% of respondents aged 14 and 15 admitted participating in a group fight. Shoplifting was the most common offence with 15%. Another 10.3% carried firearms, batons, knives or other weapons. 9.4% committed acts of vandalism. 5.5% trafficked or assisted in trafficking drugs. 1.5% admitted to burglary, 1.1% to vehicle theft. 5% committed hate crimes, 2.9% sent intimate pictures against their will. Online fraud and hacking were each admitted by 2.7%. 2.6% assaulted a person and inflicted serious injuries on the victim. 1.3% reported robbing others with a weapon, violence or serious threat.

Incarceration
In 2017, 6,863 people were incarcerated in Swiss prisons or pre-trial detention facilities, of which 49.3% were legal residents, 9.6% were asylum seekers and 41.1% were classified "other foreigners" (which includes cross-border workers, undocumented migrants, tourists, and foreigners with no fixed abode in Switzerland). 1,673 of the 6,863 were on rehab, of which 49% were foreigners with no fixed residence in Switzerland.

Crime by type 

Suspected cases of embezzlement, tax fraud, money laundering and sexual harassment have been reported in 35% of companies in Switzerland.

Money laundering

Swiss banks have served as safe havens for the wealth of dictators, despots, mobsters, arms dealers, corrupt officials, and tax cheats of all kinds.

Money laundering is a criminal offence punishable by the criminal authorities (Art. 305bis of the Swiss Criminal Code). According to the Money Laundering Reporting Office Switzerland in 2017, official "suspicious activity reports" reached nearly 4,700 (worth $16.2 billion) from 2,909 reported cases in 2016. 

The Money Laundering Reporting Office is a federal body responsible for receiving and analysing suspicious activity reports in connection with money laundering, terrorist financing, and money of criminal origin, and forwarding them to the law enforcement agencies if necessary.

Under Swiss laws, a company can be held criminally liable for inadequate organisation or failing to take all reasonable measures to prevent a crime from happening.

In 1989, the Swiss Justice Minister had to step down, following allegation of money laundering by her husband. This was the largest case of drug-related money laundering to become public.

Freeze and seize of assets
Swiss authorities can freeze assets if the law requires them to. However, seizing assets is only permitted in cases involving crime or for destituted potentates.

According to Article 72 of the Swiss criminal code, “all assets that are subject to the power of disposal of a criminal or terrorist organisation” can be permanently confiscated. “In the case of assets belonging to a person who participates in or supports such an organisation (Art. 260), it is presumed that the assets are subject to the power of disposal of the organisation until the contrary is proven.” According to experts, the forfeiture rule "does not violate the property guarantee".

Criticism

Suspicious activities' real numbers are said to be much higher than those officially reported. Besides, the government rarely follows up on these reports because of lack of means, incentives and a clear legal framework.

According to the Swiss Federal Audit Office (SFAO) the law, as it is currently written, has no dissuasive effect, since companies pay a maximum amount of CHF5 million ($5.2 million), if convicted. 

Supervisory body FINMA can warn banks of the risks they are taking following "suspicious activity reports", but the decision to accept a customer is ultimately up to the bank, with banks fearing to lose their customers to foreign or domestic competitors in some cases.

In February 2022, the European People's Party of the European Parliament proposed reviewing Swiss banking practices and money laundering status in response to the Suisse Secrets leaks, asking the European Commission to reclassify Switzerland as a high-risk country for financial crime.

According to the Basel Institute on Governance in 2022, Switzerland ranks 95th out of 129 countries when it comes to money laundering and corruption risks.

Reforms
As of 2023, financial intermediaries are required to verify the identity of customers, record which services have been provided to them, and clarify their background and purpose. Swiss-based charities must appoint a representative in Switzerland and keep a list of their members for five years. The new rules also oblige banks to inform the Money Laundering Reporting Office Switzerland (MLROS) of criminal funds, which they did not always disclose.

Loopholes

Under current rules, banking institutions and cantonal authorities can only report what’s in their registers – looking into the origins of assets or connections between individuals is not permitted (2022).

According to SFAO, the real estate sector in Switzerland is still an attractive place to introduce funds of illegal origin into the legal financial circuit.

SFAO also points to loopholes in the commodities sector, particularly the purchase of materials for smelting, which is partially excluded from the monitoring of raw materials origins. Control is limited to verification of the trade in already refined gold bars. Swiss NGO Public Eye has recommended the creation of a supervisory authority for the commodities sector to improve the tracking of the actual owners of trading firms and ensure that commodities don’t originate in conflict zones or countries subject to international sanctions.

Terrorism financing

Regulation of money laundering in Switzerland includes the Federal Act on Combating Money Laundering and Terrorist Financing (Anti-Money Laundering Act, AMLA) which requires financial intermediaries such as investment banks or insurance companies to comply with due diligence and disclosure requirements.

According to the Swiss Federal Prosecutor's office and media, in the 1990s and early 2000s Al Qaeda members had accounts at Swiss banks, including UBS.

Drugs 

 drug use was the most common reason why people aged 10–18 were reported by police (being filed, being fined, or reported to justice), however dealing has been diminished since 2010.

According to Addiction Switzerland, "Illegal substances can be found in cities quickly and relatively easily".

Cannabis use among adolescents and young adults in Switzerland has increased significantly within ten years. In 2017, 9% of adolescents and young adults aged 15–24 reported having used cannabis in the past month. The figures are much higher in the 20–24 age bracket, with 14% of men and 6.5% of women saying they had consumed cannabis in the past 30 days.

According to a recent study, 5 Swiss cities (St Gallen, Bern, Zurich, Basel and Geneva) were listed among the top 10 European cities for cocaine use.

Swiss authorities, including CHUV, estimate that dealers and traffickers make profits of $28.1-29.1 million a year in Vaud alone.

Analysis of Swiss police records suggests that participants in medical drug rehabilitation programs tend to reduce cocaine, cannabis and heroin use, and the need to commit other crimes to buy their drugs, such as shoplifting, burglary or car theft.

In 2022, a near all-time record Brazilian shipment of 500kg of cocaine was intercepted by the Swiss authorities at a Nespresso factory in Fribourg.

According to a 2023 study, 10–15% of the people who drive a vehicle in Switzerland are under the influence of dangerous substances (including cocaine).

Theft

19 cars are stolen in Switzerland every day (2021). Forty thousand bikes are stolen each year (2022).

Homicide 

In 2019, there were 161 attempted and 46 completed homicides, for a homicide rate of 0.54 per 100,000 population. Of the 207 cases, 105 were committed with bladed weapons, 20 with firearms and 47 unarmed. Out of 229 identified suspects; 197 were male, 126 (55%) were foreigners of which 72 had permanent residence. 29 cases (63%) of completed and 50 cases (31%) of attempted homicide were classed as domestic violence.

Cybercriminality

In 2016, 14,033 cybercrime cases were reported to police in Switzerland, compared to 11,575 in 2015 and 5,330 in 2011. Swiss media reported that over three million Swiss email usernames and associated passwords are available on the net since 2019. These include login details of government ministers, government employees and the military.

In 2019, computer-related infractions include the fraudulent misuse of a computer (5,583 cases in 2019, a rise of 598 relative to 2018) and pornography-related offenses (2,387 cases, a jump of over 50%).

In total, some 30,351 crimes were reported in the virtual space in 2021 (with online sales of “non-existent goods” being the most common crime).

Sex crimes
The Swiss legal definition of rape is "an assault during vaginal sexual intercourse with a woman", thus exempting men from the status of rape victims. 
 Rape is punished by a prison sentence of one to ten years.
Indecent assault, which includes "sexual acts similar to intercourse or any sexual act" (kissing, groping), is punished by a monetary fine for lighter crimes or a prison sentence of up to ten years. The sex of the victim is not specified.

Pedocriminality

In 2018 alone, the FBI reported 9,000 cases of child pornography and pedo-criminality originating in Switzerland, to the Swiss authorities (FedPol). It is unclear what the Swiss police does with this list. Other reports have been compiled in recent years by private organizations on this subject.

Cases of sexual abuse reported in the Catholic Church rose from 9 cases in 2012 to 65 in 2017 (63% of victims were 16 or younger and 27% were 12 or younger).

Hate crimes

In Switzerland public discrimination or invoking to rancor against persons or a group of people because of their race, ethnicity, is penalized with a term of imprisonment of up to 3 years or a fine. In 1934, the authorities of the Canton of Basel-Stadt criminalized anti-Jewish hate speech, e.g., the accusation of ritual murders, mostly in reaction against a pro-Nazi antisemitic group and newspaper, the Volksbund.

In 2019, over 350 racist incidents were reported to the authorities. These cases relate to xenophobia (145 cases), anti-Black discrimination (132 cases) and anti-Muslim discrimination (55 cases), which is a "small percentage" of the overall racist incidents in Switzerland according to the authorities.

In 2020, xenophobia was found to be the most frequent motive (304 cases) for discrimination, followed by discrimination against black people (206 cases) and Muslims (55 cases). In 2021, 41 cases of anti-Asian racism were reported for the first time. There were also 92 reports of anti-LGBT hate crimes in 2021.

Corruption 

Council of Europe's Group of State Against Corruption (GRECO) in its evaluation report noted that specificities of Switzerland's institutions which enjoy considerable public confidence. It underlines, however, that the very organisation of the system allows subtle pressure to be exerted on politicians and the judiciary.

Transparency International's 2017 Corruption Perception Index ranks Switzerland as the 5th least corrupt state out of 180 countries.

In 2018 the Tax Justice Network ranked Switzerland's banking sector as the "most corrupt" in the world due to a large offshore banking industry and very strict secrecy laws. The ranking attempts to measure how much assistance the country's legal systems provide to money laundering, and to protecting corruptly obtained wealth.

White collar crime 

In 2020, Swiss courts dealt with 52 major cases of economic crime that amounted to CHF355 million ($384 million) in losses. Most cases related to social security and insurance fraud.

Crime dynamics

Immigrant criminality

The crime rate among resident foreigners ("immigrant criminality") is significantly higher (by a factor 3.7 counting convictions under criminal law in 2003).
In 1997, there were for the first time more foreigners than Swiss among the convicts under criminal law (out of a fraction of 20.6% of the total population at the time). In 1999, the Federal Department of Justice and Police ordered a study regarding delinquency and nationality (Arbeitsgruppe "Ausländerkriminalität"), which in its final report (2001) found that a conviction rate under criminal law about 12 times higher among asylum seekers (4%), while the conviction rate among other resident foreigners was about twice as high (0.6%) compared to Swiss citizens (0.3%).

  Specific immigration status not collected
  Final number may change due to appeals and trials still in progress

In 2010 for the first time was a statistic published which listed delinquency by nationality (based on 2009 data).
To avoid distortions due to demographic structure, only the male population aged between 18 and 34 was considered for each group. From this study it became clear that crime rate is highly correlated on the country of origin of the various migrant groups.
Thus, immigrants from Germany, France and Austria had a significantly lower crime rate than Swiss citizens (60% to 80%), while immigrants from Angola, Nigeria and Algeria had a crime rate of above 600% of that of Swiss population.
In between these extremes were immigrants from former Yugoslavia, with crime rates of between 210% and 300% of the Swiss value.

The full report listed 24 nationalities plus the crime rate of Swiss citizens (fixed at 100%), and the average value of all foreign citizens combined, at 160%. Commentators expressed surprise at the clear geographical structure of the list, giving, in decreasing order, Africa, the Middle East and the Balkans, Southern Europe and Western and Central Europe.
The Federal Statistics Office published the study with the caveat that the sizes of the groups under comparison vary considerably.
For example, the net impact of a crime rate increased by 530% among 500 Angolans will still be five times smaller than a crime rate increased by 30% among 46'000 Portuguese. The country is a target for foreign criminals on account of its reputation as an affluent nation. 

On 28 November 2010, 53% of voters approved a new, tougher deportation law. This law, proposed by the Swiss People's Party, called for the automatic expulsion of non-Swiss offenders convicted of a number of crimes, including murder, breaking and entry and even welfare fraud. As the proposal makes deportation mandatory, it denies judges any judicial discretion over deportation. An alternative proposal, that included case by case reviews and integration measures, was rejected by 54% of voters.

Organized crime

Swiss banks have served as safe havens for the wealth of dictators, despots, mobsters, arms dealers, corrupt officials, and tax cheats of all kinds.

In 2022, Swiss media reported that one of Switzerland’s top prosecutors (Dick Marty) was the target of an assassination plot by the Serbian government and Serbian mafia.

According to the Swiss attorney general in 2022, one of Switzerland's "great weaknesses" is that his federal agency has no national overview to combat organized crime because of the federal structure of Switzerland and the relative independence of the cantons.

Human trafficking

The number of victims of human trafficking in Switzerland allegedly increased by 50% between 2019 and 2021 from 142 to 207. About two-thirds of the victims were trafficked for sexual purposes, the rest for labour exploitation and criminal activities.

See also
 Law enforcement in Switzerland
 Swiss Criminal Code
 Gun laws in Switzerland

Notes and references

External links
 Switzerland Black Markets

 
Law of Switzerland